Josefina Cambiaso (born 23 April 1997) is a Chilean field hockey player.

Cambiaso first represented Chile in the national senior team in 2018, in a test series against Canada. Cambiaso also represented the Chilean junior team at the 2016 Junior Pan American Cup and the 2016 Junior World Cup.

Cambiaso was part of the Chile team at the 2018 South American Games in Cochabamba, Bolivia. At the tournament, the team won a bronze medal, defeating Brazil in the third place playoff.

References

1997 births
Living people
Chilean female field hockey players
South American Games bronze medalists for Chile
South American Games medalists in field hockey
Competitors at the 2018 South American Games
20th-century Chilean women
21st-century Chilean women